Dagny Corcoran (1944/1945 – November 9, 2022) was an American art book dealer. She was the curator and owner of the bookstore Art Catalogues, which she opened in the late 1970s in West Hollywood, California. The store was later located in the Museum of Contemporary Art, Los Angeles from 2005 to 2009 and the Los Angeles County Museum of Art from 2010 to 2019. The store is currently located in Culver City.

References 

1940s births
2022 deaths
American booksellers
Year of birth missing